Carmentina pyristacta is a species of sedge moths in the genus Carmentina. It was described by Turner in 1913. It is found in Australia, including Queensland.

References

Moths described in 1913
Glyphipterigidae